Effect may refer to:

 A result or change of something
 List of effects
 Cause and effect, an idiom describing causality

Pharmacy and pharmacology
 Drug effect, a change resulting from the administration of a drug
 Therapeutic effect, a beneficial change in medical condition, often caused by a drug
 Adverse effect or side effect, an unwanted change in medical condition caused by a drug

In media
 Special effect, an artificial illusion
 Sound effect, an artificially created or enhanced sound
 Visual effects, artificially created or enhanced images
Audio signal processing
 Effects unit, a device used to manipulate electronic sound 
 Effects pedal, a small device attached to an instrument to modify its sound

Other uses
 Effects, one's personal property or belongings
 Effects (G.I. Joe), a fictional character in the G.I. Joe universe
 Effects (film), a 2005 film
 Effect size, a measure of the strength of a relationship between two variables
 Effect system, formal system which describes the computational effects of computer programs
 Pro-Design Effect, an Austrian paraglider design

See also 
 
 
 Affect (disambiguation)
 Effectiveness
 Efficacy
 Pragmatism, the philosophy of causes and effects